Alberto Martín and Fernando Vicente were the defending champions, but did not participate this year.

Juan Pablo Brzezicki and Juan Pablo Guzmán won in the final 6–2, 6–0, against Robin Haase and Rogier Wassen.

Seeds

Draw

Draw

External links
Doubles draw

Doubles